Nasarawa is a Local Government Area in Nasarawa State, Nigeria. Its headquarters are in the town of Nasarawa, located at 8°32'N 7°42'E, with a population of 30,949 (as of 2016). The local government area has an area of 5,704 km and a population of 189,835 at the 2006 census. The postal code of the area is 962.

Education
Nasarawa town is home to tertiary institutions such as:
 Federal Polytechnic Nasarawa
 Makama Dogo School of Health Technology Nasarawa

Resources
The area's economic activity centers on the tin and columbite mining industry and farming.

Agriculture
Nasarawa is a market center for the melon, yams, sorghum, millet, soybeans, shea nuts, and cotton grown in the surrounding area. The town is served by a secondary school and a hospital. It is located at the intersection of local roads that lead to Keffi and the Benue River ports of Loko and Umaisha. Pop. (2006) local government area, 189,835

Kingdom
Nasarawa, also spelled Nassarawa, is a town in Nasarawa State, central Nigeria. The town lies just north of a fork in the Okwa River, which is a tributary of the Benue River. Nasarawa was founded in 1835 in the Eloyi (Afo) tribal territory by Umaru, a dissident official from the nearby town of Keffi, who hailed from Ruma in Katsina State, as the seat of the new emirate of Nassarawa. Umaru expanded his domain by conquering neighboring territory and made Nassarawa a vassal state to Zaria (175 miles [282 km] north). One of his successors, Muhammadu Dan Waji (reigned 1878–1923), enlarged the emirate by various conquests and, in 1900, was one of the first emirs to pledge allegiance to Great Britain. In 1976 Nasarawa became part of Plateau State; in 1996, it became part of Nasarawa state

Fulani Rulers
Chronology of Fulani Rulers of Nasarawa Since 1835 - Date

References

External links

 
Local Government Areas in Nasarawa State